Solomon Twene (born 1 August 1996) is a Ghanaian professional footballer who plays as a defender for Ghanaian Premier League side Dreams F.C.

Club career

Early career 
Twene started his career playing for Wassaman United in the Ghana Division One League. He later joined Nzema Kotoko, playing for them in the same league.

Al-Shorta SC 
Twene joined Sudanese top flight side Al-Shorta SC El-Gadarif in 2019, playing for them for one season. He scored four goals in the 2019–20 season in the Sudanese Premier League.

Dreams FC 
Twene moved back to Ghana and joined Dreams FC ahead of the 2020–21 Ghana Premier League season. He signed a three-year contract on a free transfer after successfully passing his mandatory medical check up on transfer deadline day. He became the second Nzema Kotoko player to join Dreams after club's all-time top-scorer Agyenim Boateng Mensah signed for them. He was named on the team's squad list as the league was set to restart. On 16 November 2020, he made his debut in a goalless draw against International Allies, playing the full 90 minutes in the process.

International career 
In January 2014, Twene was called up to the Ghana national under-20 football team ahead of the qualifiers for the 2014 Africa Nations Youth Championship, he however did not make the cut for the final tournament.

References

External links 
 

Living people
1996 births
Association football defenders
Ghanaian footballers
Dreams F.C. (Ghana) players
Ghana Premier League players
Expatriate footballers in Sudan
Ghanaian expatriate sportspeople in Sudan